The 1928 Massachusetts Aggies football team represented Massachusetts Agricultural College in the 1928 college football season. The Aggies were members of the New England Conference, but did not face any conference opponents this season. The team was coached by Charles McGeoch and played its home games at Alumni Field in Amherst, Massachusetts. The 1928 season was McGeoch's first with the Aggies. Massachusetts finished the season with a record of 2–5–1.

Schedule

References

Massachusetts
UMass Minutemen football seasons
Massachusetts Aggies football